Krym-Sarayevo (Qırım-Haray) is a rural locality (a selo) in Neftekamsk, Bashkortostan, Russia. The population was 273 as of 2010. There are 7 streets.

Geography 
Krym-Sarayevo is located 10 km southeast of Neftekamsk. Tashkinovo is the nearest rural locality.

References 

Rural localities in Neftekamsk urban okrug